Tovomita weberbaueri is a species of flowering plant in the family Clusiaceae. It is found only in Peru.

References

weberbaueri
Endemic flora of Peru
Vulnerable plants
Taxonomy articles created by Polbot